Balvan Point (‘Nos Balvan’ \'nos bal-'van\) is the rocky point on the south side of the entrance to Solari Bay on Nordenskjöld Coast in Graham Land.  It was formed as a result of the break-up of Larsen Ice Shelf in the area in the late 20th century.  The feature is named after the settlement of Balvan in Northern Bulgaria.

Location
SCAR Antarctic Digital Database mapping in 2012.

Maps
 Antarctic Digital Database (ADD). Scale 1:250000 topographic map of Antarctica. Scientific Committee on Antarctic Research (SCAR). Since 1993, regularly upgraded and updated

References
 Balvan Point. SCAR Composite Antarctic Gazetteer.
 Bulgarian Antarctic Gazetteer. Antarctic Place-names Commission. (details in Bulgarian, basic data in English)

External links
 Balvan Point. Copernix satellite image

Headlands of Graham Land
Nordenskjöld Coast
Bulgaria and the Antarctic